RHT may refer to:

 Stock symbol for Red Hat Inc.
 IATA code for Alxa Right Banner Badanjilin Airport, Inner Mongolia, China
 Retinohypothalamic tract
 Right-hand traffic
 Randomized Hough transform, in image processing
 Retrogression heat treatment, in metals processing